Pewter is a malleable metal alloy consisting of tin (85–99%), antimony (approximately 5–10%), copper (2%), bismuth, and sometimes silver. Copper and antimony (and in antiquity lead) act as hardeners, but lead may be used in lower grades of pewter, imparting a bluish tint. The word pewter is probably a variation of the word spelter, a term for zinc alloys (originally a colloquial name for zinc).

History 
Pewter was first used around the beginning of the Bronze Age in the Near East. The earliest known piece of pewter was found in an Egyptian tomb, c. 1450 BC, but it is unlikely that this was the first use of the material.  Pewter  was used for decorative metal items and tableware in ancient times by the Egyptians and later the Romans, and came into extensive use in Europe from the Middle Ages until the various developments in pottery and glass-making during the 18th and 19th centuries. Pewter was the chief material for producing plates, cups, and bowls until the making of porcelain. Mass production of pottery, porcelain and glass products have almost universally replaced pewter in daily life, although pewter artifacts continue to be produced, mainly as decorative or specialty items. Pewter was also used around East Asia. Although some items still exist, Ancient Roman pewter is rare.

Lidless mugs and lidded tankards may be the most familiar pewter artifacts from the late 17th and 18th centuries, although the metal was also used for many other items including porringers (shallow bowls), plates, dishes, basins, spoons, measures, flagons, communion cups, teapots, sugar bowls, beer steins (tankards), and cream jugs. In the early 19th century, changes in fashion caused a decline in the use of pewter flatware. At the same time, production increased of both cast and spun pewter tea sets, whale-oil lamps, candlesticks, and so on. Later in the century, pewter alloys were often used as a base metal for silver-plated objects.

In the late 19th century, pewter came back into fashion with the revival of medieval objects for decoration. New replicas of medieval pewter objects were created, and collected for decoration. Today, pewter is used in decorative objects, mainly collectible statuettes and figurines, game figures, aircraft and other models, (replica) coins, pendants, plated jewellery and so on. Certain athletic contests, such as the United States Figure Skating Championships, award pewter medals to fourth-place finishers.

Types 
In antiquity pewter was tin alloyed with lead and sometimes copper. Older pewters with higher lead content are heavier, tarnish faster, and oxidation has a darker, silver-gray color. Pewters containing lead are no longer used in items that will come in contact with the human body (such as cups, plates, or jewelry) due to the toxicity of lead. Modern pewters are available that are completely free of lead, although many pewters containing lead are still being produced for other purposes.

A typical European casting alloy contains 94% tin, 1% copper and 5% antimony. A European pewter sheet would contain 92% tin, 2% copper, and 6% antimony. Asian pewter, produced mostly in Malaysia, Singapore, and Thailand, contains a higher percentage of tin, usually 97.5% tin, 1% copper, and 1.5% antimony. This makes the alloy slightly softer.

So-called Mexican pewter is any of various alloys of aluminium used for decorative items.

Pewter is also used to imitate platinum in costume jewelry.

Properties 
Since pewter is soft at room temperature, a pewter bell does not ring clearly.  Cooling it in liquid nitrogen hardens it and enables it to ring, while also making it more brittle.

Since pewter is a softer material it can be manipulated in various ways such as being cast, hammered, lathed, and engraved.

See also 
 Britannia metal
 English pewter
 Spin casting
 Solder

Notes

References 

.
.
.

External links 
.   

 PewterBank
 

Fusible alloys
Tin alloys